The Collaborative International Dictionary of English (CIDE) was derived from the 1913 Webster's Dictionary and has been supplemented with some of the definitions from WordNet. It is being proof-read and supplemented by volunteers from around the world.

This electronic dictionary is also made available as a potential starting point for development of a modern comprehensive encyclopedic dictionary, to be accessible freely on the Internet, and developed by the efforts of all individuals willing to help build a large and freely available knowledge base.

There are several derivative versions of this dictionary on the Internet, in some cases reformatted or provided with an interface:

 Project Gutenberg, in the etext96 directory
 The DICT development group
 The GNU project's GCIDE

References

External links
GCIDE_XML The GNU version of CIDE presented in the Extensible Markup Language (XML).

Online English dictionaries

fr:GCIDE#Collaborative_International_Dictionary_of_English